Roger Farrell Erickson (born August 30, 1956) is a retired American professional baseball pitcher who played in Major League Baseball from – for the Minnesota Twins and New York Yankees.

Career
Erickson was selected by the Twins in the third round of the 1977 amateur draft after pitching for the University of New Orleans. In his first pro season, Erickson put up an 8–4 record and a 1.98 earned run average in Double-A. The following year, he made his major league debut on April 6, 1978, starting and going 6 innings to earn a 5–4 win over the Seattle Mariners. He finished his rookie season with 14 wins and a .519 winning percentage, second highest on the pitching staff.

However, from 1979 through 1981, pitching for a succession of poor Minnesota teams, he went a cumulative 13–31 in 70 games, with an ERA of 4.10. In , he began the year by posting a 4–3 (4.87) record in seven starts. Then he was traded along with Butch Wynegar to the Yankees for Larry Milbourne, John Pacella and Pete Filson on May 12. The defending American League champion Bombers were experiencing a bumpy defense of their title, employing five pitching coaches and winning only 79 games all season. Erickson worked in only 16 games for New York, then went on the injured list with a sore shoulder. It was his last MLB appearance. He was traded to the Kansas City Royals during the off-season but was released without making the varsity; he would pitch in the Detroit Tigers and St. Louis Cardinals systems, as well as with unaffiliated minor-league teams in the California and Mexican Leagues, before leaving pro ball in 1987.

Erickson posted a 35–53 career record and a 4.13 earned run average, with 24 complete games in 117 starts and one save coming out of the bullpen. In 135 career games and 799  innings pitched, he allowed 868 hits and 251 walks, with 365 strikeouts.

References

External links

1956 births
Living people
American expatriate baseball players in Mexico
Baseball players from Illinois
Columbus Clippers players
Evansville Triplets players
Ganaderos de Tabasco players
Leones de Yucatán players
Louisville Redbirds players
Major League Baseball pitchers
Mexican League baseball pitchers
Minnesota Twins players
New Orleans Privateers baseball players
New York Yankees players
Orlando Twins players
San Bernardino Pride players
San Jose Bees players
Sportspeople from Springfield, Illinois
Toledo Mud Hens players